Eurovision 2007 could refer to:
Eurovision Dance Contest 2007, the first Eurovision Dance Contest that was held in September 2007
Eurovision Song Contest 2007, the fifty-second Eurovision Song Contest that was held in May 2007
Junior Eurovision Song Contest 2007, the fifth Junior Eurovision Song Contest that was held in December 2007